Nymphidae, sometimes called split-footed lacewings, are a family of winged insects of the order Neuroptera. There are 35 extant species native to Australia and New Guinea.

Nymphidae stand somewhat apart from other living Myrmeleontoidea. The antlions (Myrmeleontidae) and the owlflies (Ascalaphidae) are more closely related to them, but the bulk of the Nymphidae sister groups include extinct taxa known only from fossils, such as the Nymphitidae, Osmylopsychopidae or Babinskaiidae. The spoonwings (Nemopteridae) were at one time also believed to be quite closely related, but they seem to belong to another lineage of Myrmeleontiformia altogether. The family is divided into two major subfamilies, Nymphinae and Myiodactylinae. The larvae of nymphines are similar to antlions, with relatively elongate bodies, and camouflage themselves in debris, living and hunting on the ground, while myiodactylines have wide, disc shaped bodies, and are arboreal, living on plants.

Fossil genera are known from Europe, Asia as well as North and South America, extending back to the Middle Jurassic.

Genera

Extant genera 
Subfamily Nymphinae Rambur 1842
Nymphes Leach, 1814
Austronymphes Esben-Petersen, 1914
Nesydrion Gerstaecker, 1885
Subfamily Myiodactylinae Handlirsch 1908
Myiodactylus Brauer, 1866
Norfolius Navás, 1922
Nymphydrion Banks, 1913
Osmylops Banks, 1913
Umbranymphes New, 1987

Extinct genera 

 †Baissoleon Makarkin 1990 Yixian Formation, China, Zaza Formation, Russia, Early Cretaceous (Aptian)
 †Cretonymphes Ponomarenko 1992 Zaza Formation, Russia, Early Cretaceous (Aptian)
 †Dactylomyius Novokshonov 1990 Arkagalinskaya Formation, Russia, Late Cretaceous (Campanian) (possibly belongs to Myiodactylinae)
 †Daonymphes Makarkin et al. 2013 Daohugou Bed, China, Middle/Late Jurassic
 †Elenchonymphes Engel and Grimaldi 2008 Burmese amber, Myanmar, Late Cretaceous (Cenomanian)
 †Liminympha Ren and Engel 2007 Daohugou Bed, China, Middle/Late Jurassic
 †Mesonymphes Carpenter 1929 Karabastau Formation, Kazakhstan, Late Jurassic, Solnhofen Limestone, Germany, Late Jurassic (Tithonian)
 †"Mesonymphes" apicalis Ponomarenko 1992 Zaza Formation, Russia, Early Cretaceous (Aptian)
 †Nymphavus Badano et al. 2018 Burmese amber, Myanmar, Late Cretaceous (Cenomanian) (known from larvae only, possibly belongs to Nymphinae)
 †Nymphites Haase 1890 Daohugou Bed, China, Middle/Late Jurassic Solnhofen Limestone, Germany, Late Jurassic (Tithonian) Zaza Formation, Russia, Early Cretaceous (Aptian)
 †Olindanymphes Martins-Neto 2005 Crato Formation, Brazil, Early Cretaceous (Aptian)
 †Santananymphes Martins-Neto 2005 Crato Formation, Brazil, Early Cretaceous (Aptian)
 †Spilonymphes Shi et al. 2015 (split-footed lacewing) Yixian Formation, China, Early Cretaceous (Aptian)
 Subfamily Nymphinae Rambur 1842
 †Epinesydrion Archibald and Makarkin 2020 Kamloops Group, Canada, Eocene (Ypresian)
 †Nymphes? georgei Archibald et al. 2009 Klondike Mountain Formation, Washington, United States, Eocene (Ypresian) (possibly synonymous with Epinesydrion)
 †Pronymphes Krüger 1923 Baltic amber, Eocene
 †Rafaelnymphes Myskowiak et al. 2016 Crato Formation, Brazil, Early Cretaceous (Aptian)

References 

 
Taxa named by Jules Pierre Rambur
Neuroptera families